Alpha Oumar Sow (born 15 August 1997) is a Guinean professional footballer who plays as a midfielder for Guinée Championnat National club Ashanti GB and the Guinea national team.

References

External links 

 

1997 births
Living people
Guinean footballers
Association football midfielders
AS Ashanti Golden Boys players

Guinée Championnat National players
Guinea international footballers
Guinea A' international footballers
2020 African Nations Championship players